Myanmar coup d'état may refer to:

 1962 Burmese coup d'état
 1988 Burmese coup d'état
 2021 Myanmar coup d'état